Pahang Old Royal Mausoleum is a Pahang royal burial grounds at Kampung Marhum, Kuala Pahang, Pekan, Pahang, Malaysia.

List of graves

Rulers, with the title Bendahara Seri Maharaja
 Bendahara Seri Maharaja Abdul Majid (1756–1802)
 Bendahara Seri Maharaja Muhammad (1802–1803)
 Bendahara Seri Maharaja Koris (1803–1806)
 Bendahara Seri Maharaja Ali (1806–1857)

Sultan
 Sultan Ahmad al-Mu’azzam Shah (1881–1914) (Bendahara Seri Maharaja Tun Ahmad (1863-1881))
 Sultan Mahmud Shah (1914–1917)
 Sultan Abdullah al-Mu’tassim Billah Shah (1917–1932)

Queen Consort/Consort
 HH Tengku Hajjah Kalsum binti Tun ‘Abdullah  Tengku Ampuan Besar (died 27th August 1967)
 Y.Bhg. Cik Wan Chantik binti Wan Muhammad Amin (died 30 March 1944)

Royal Family Pahang
 Y.A.M. Tengku Jusoh [Yusuf] ibni al-Marhum Sultan Sir Ahmad Mua’azzam Shah  (died 1939) Tengku Panglima Perang
 Y.A.M. Tengku ‘Abdu’l Rahman ibni Al-Marhum Sultan Sir ‘Abdullah Al-Mutassim Billah Shah (died 1919) 

Buildings and structures in Pahang
Mausoleums in Malaysia
Pekan District